Erlys García Baró (born July 28, 1985 in Havana) is a Cuban footballer who plays as a defender.

Career

Cuba
García began his career in his native Cuba, playing with Ciudad de La Habana in the Campeonato Nacional de Fútbol de Cuba.

While playing for the Cuba U-23 national team in the Olympic qualifying tournament in Tampa, Florida, in March 2008, García—along with several other members of the team—defected to the United States under the wet foot dry foot scheme that allows Cubans who reach U.S. soil to obtain asylum.

United States
Following several unsuccessful trials with clubs such as FC Tampa Bay, García found his way to Los Angeles, and played in various LA-area amateur leagues before signing with the Los Angeles Azul Legends of the USL Premier Development League in early 2010. He made six appearances for Azul during the regular season.

In February 2011, García signed with the expansion Los Angeles Blues of the new USL Professional Division. The club announced on November 10, 2011, that Garcia would return for the 2012 season.

International
In addition to playing with the Cuban U-23 national team, García also obtained two caps with the full Cuban national team prior to his defection, in two friendlies against Guyana in February 2008.

References

External links
 

1985 births
Living people
Sportspeople from Havana
Defecting Cuban footballers
Association football defenders
Cuban footballers
Cuba international footballers
FC Ciudad de La Habana players
LA Laguna FC players
Orange County SC players
Cuban expatriate footballers
Expatriate soccer players in the United States
Cuban expatriate sportspeople in the United States
USL League Two players
USL Championship players
United Premier Soccer League players
FC Golden State Force players